Marvel SuperHeroes: What The--?! is Marvel Comics' self-parody stop-motion animated web-series. The series used superhero action figures to create the stop motion animation. The series began in 2009.

Episode list

Regular episodes
There's No Business Like Snow Business
Red Carpet M.O.D.O.K.
The Problem with Pirates
San Diego or Bust!
M.O.D.O.K.'s M.O.M.E.N.T.S.
Grumpy Old Man Logan
Thriller-er
Twi Harder
99 Hulk Balloons
M.O.D.O.K. Holiday Special
Deadpool FYC
Iron Mania 2010
The Hero Your Hero Could Smell Like
X-Men vs. Vampires: Bite Me
Dr. Strange and the Magical Mixup
A Very Merry Spidey Day
Captain America vs. Iron Man: The Big Game!
For Your Consideration (Again)
MODOK Makes A Meme!
X-Men: The True Early Years!
Wolverine in "Partial Recall"
Strange Halloween Tales of Suspense to Astonish!
Howard the Duck's Silver Anniversary!
The Amazing Spider-Date
Obnoxio The Clown Returns!!
The Age Of ULTRON
Ep. 27
San Diego Comic Con 2013 Special
Holiday Special with Iron Man & Deadpool
Deadpool Vs. The Punisher
Go Undercover with Captain America in Marvel Super Heroes
The Inferior Spider-Man
Daredevil Vs. She-Hulk
Thanos Returns to Comic-Con
Catchphrase Workshop
Avengers & X-Men: AXIS
2014 Halloween Spooktacular
Holiday Spectacular 2014
Ultron's Master Plan
Happy Valentine's Day?
Ultron & Vision: Robo Roomies
Wonder Man's Secret Wars
Ant-Man's No Small Feats
All-New, All-Different Avengers
Halloween Spooktacular 2015
Holiday Spectacular 2015
New Years Resolutions!
A Magical Valentines Special
Daredevil vs. Punisher
50th Episode Extravaganza!
Happy Fourth of July!
The Other Agents of S.H.I.E.L.D.
Captain America's Wartime Friends!
Doctor Strange's Strange Tales of Strangeness
Father's Day Special 2017

Special episodes
Pilot
Unleash The Fury
Extended Comic-Con Special
All-New Promo
SIEGE Promo
MarvelFest Extravaganza!
Winter Games Coverage!
MSH: What The--?! Winter Games: Day 1
MSH: What The--?! Winter Games: Day 2
MSH: What The--?! Winter Games: Day 3
MSH: What The--?! Winter Games: Day 9
MSH: What The--?! Winter Games: Day 11
MSH: What The--?! Winter Games: Day 12
MSH: What The--?! Winter Games: Day 14
MSH: What The--?! Winter Games: Day 15
MSH: What The--?! Winter Games: Day 16
MSH: What The--?! Winter Games: Day 17
Shadowland Promo
NYCC Promo
MODOK 1984—er, 2011
Marvel Frogs
Mean Deadpool
The Red Hulk
Legitimate Moxie
127 Seconds
Earth Day
Harley Davidson Special
Thor Joins 7-Eleven
Who Watches The Watcher
The Incredible Drive: Part One
The Incredible Drive: Part Two
The Incredible Drive: Part Three
The Incredible Drive: Part Four
Avengers vs. X-Men Part 1
Avengers vs. X-Men Part 2
Avengers vs. X-Men Part 3
The Perfect Combination
Marvel vs. Capcom!
Valentine's Day Special
Vans Special
Guardians of the Galaxy Special
Wolverine Adamantium Collection
Geek Week
Unlimited Plus
NYCC 2013
The Lost Episode
Western Union Special
The Secret Origin of Delivery-Man
A Tall Order
Civil War
Send Money with Your Phone!
Out of the Blue!
Strange Destinations (+ Alternate Ending)

See also
 Not Brand Echh
 What The--?!
 Robot Chicken
 What If...?
 List of television series based on Marvel Comics

References

External links
 Marvel Super Heroes: What The--?!, on IMDB

Marvel Comics parodies
American adult animated comedy television series
American adult animated web series
American comedy web series
American stop-motion adult animated television series
Web series based on Marvel Comics
Marvel Comics animation
Adult animated television shows based on Marvel Comics